Dysgonomonas alginatilytica  is a Gram-negative, facultatively anaerobic, non-spore-forming and non-motile bacterium from the genus of Dysgonomonas which has been isolated from sea sand from Hiroshima on Japan. Dysgonomonas alginatilytica has the ability to degrade alginate.

References

External links 
Type strain of Dysgonomonas alginatilytica at BacDive -  the Bacterial Diversity Metadatabase

Bacteroidia
Bacteria described in 2015